The smiling snake eel (Ichthyapus selachops, also known as the smiling sand eel) is an eel in the family Ophichthidae (worm/snake eels). It was described by David Starr Jordan and Charles Henry Gilbert in 1882, originally under the genus Apterichthys. It is a marine, tropical eel which is known from the eastern central and southeastern Pacific Ocean, including Colombia, Costa Rica, Panama, Ecuador, and Mexico.

Due to its wide distribution, lack of known threats, and lack of observed population decline, the IUCN redlist currently lists the Smiling snake-eel as Least Concern.

References

Ophichthidae
Fish described in 1882
Taxa named by David Starr Jordan